K. R. Ramsingh (c. 1915 – 18 October 1985) was an Indian theatre, film and voice actor.

Early life
Ramsingh was born into a Rajput family in Nagercoil, Travancore (present day Kanyakumari district of Tamil Nadu). He was educated at the Hindu Higher Secondary School, Nagercoil. At a very young age, he was drawn towards theatre. Since his parents however were not supportive of his decision, he had to leave his family and joined an amateur drama company. After working for some companies, he joined the "Sri Ramabala Gaana Vinoda Sabha", a theatre group which consisted of future artists including M. S. Viswanathan and R. Muthuraman. During this time, Ramsingh won acclaim for acting in a play called Puyalukkuppin – he performed the role of a dictator. Later he acted in a devotional play based on the life of the Vaishnava sage Thirumazhisai Aazhwar. It was staged in Madras for over 400 days. After establishing himself as a leading theatre artist, he got offers to act in films. He played the lead role as saint Vishwamitra in the 1948 Tamil film Brahmarishi Vishwamithra. He was paired opposite T. R. Rajakumari, who played the role of Menaka. The dialogues of the film were written by playwright Pammal Sambandha Mudaliar. The film was also released in Hindi with Ramsingh reprising his role. However, the film's failure prompted Ramsingh to go back to theatre.

Film career 
After a brief hiatus, he returned to films through Minnal Veeran starring Ranjan and Sandhya in the lead. Ramsingh played the main antagonist in the film. Following that, he went on to act in similar roles in films such as  Puyal and Kanniyin Kaadhali. His role as a amputated wizard in K. Ramnath's Vijayakumari (1950) fetched him critical acclaim. Ramsingh was next seen in M. G. Ramachandran's Nadodi Mannan, where he played Bhanumathi Ramakrishna's father, Mahadevi, and Maruthanaatu Veeran.

While acting in films, he worked as a voice actor for films dubbed from other languages in Tamil. He provided the voice-over for Prithviraj Kapoor in a Hindi film. Kapoor was so impressed with Ramsingh's voice so that he requested the latter to do the voice-over for him in the Tamil version of Mughal-e-Azam. In the later part of his career, he worked mainly as a voice actor while making appearances in a few films.

Death
Ramsingh died at the age of 70 on 18 October 1985 at a private hospital in Kodambakkam, Madras.

Filmography

Awards and honours
Ramsingh was awarded the Kalaimamani award for his contributions to arts.

References

1910s births
1985 deaths
Tamil dramatists and playwrights
Indian male voice actors
Male actors in Tamil cinema
People from Nagercoil
Year of birth uncertain
20th-century Indian dramatists and playwrights
20th-century Indian male actors
Indian male dramatists and playwrights
Dramatists and playwrights from Tamil Nadu
20th-century Indian male writers